Fairplay is an unincorporated community and census-designated place in southern Douglas County, Georgia, United States.

It first appeared as a CDP in the 2020 Census with a population of 1,267.

Nearby communities
The nearby communities are Winston and Douglasville.

Demographics

2020 census

Note: the US Census treats Hispanic/Latino as an ethnic category. This table excludes Latinos from the racial categories and assigns them to a separate category. Hispanics/Latinos can be of any race.

Schools

The main schools of the area are South Douglas Elementary, Fairplay Middle School, and although it is not technically apart of the area's school system Alexander High School.

References

External links

Unincorporated communities in Douglas County, Georgia
Census-designated places in Douglas County, Georgia